The MTV Video Music Award Japan for Best R&B Video (Japanese:) has been given annually since 2002. Namie Amuro has won it four times.

Results
The following table displays the nominees and the winners in bold print with a yellow background.

2000s

2010s

See also
MTV Video Music Award for Best R&B Video
MTV Europe Music Award for Best R&B